Jannat 2 is an Indian 2012 Hindi-language crime thriller film directed by Kunal Deshmukh. It is a spiritual sequel to his 2008 film Jannat and stars Emraan Hashmi, Esha Gupta and Randeep Hooda.

Jannat 2 was released on 4 May 2012 and emerged as a commercial success. Gupta, who made her acting debut with the film, received a Filmfare Best Female Debut nomination for her performance.

Plot
The story follows Sonu Dilli (Emraan Hashmi), a street-smart, small time arms dealer in Delhi who has the gift of gab. When he is interrogated by a tough cop, ACP Pratap Raghuvanshi (Randeep Hooda), he turns informer for the latter. Although helping Pratap puts Sonu in jail for a little time, he continues to purvey the ACP with information about illegal arms racket as he has no other choice. But when Sonu falls in love with Dr Jhanvi (Esha Gupta) and manages to woo her, he wants to leave the life of crime and settle down. However, Pratap, who is hell bent upon finding who the leader of the arms racket is, persuades Sonu to continue being his informer by promising him protection and a good life afterward.

Sonu's world is shaken to the core when he realises, after his marriage to Jhanvi, that Jhanvi's estranged father, in Intermission scene Mangal Singh Tomar (Manish Choudhary), is actually the leader of the guns/arms business in Delhi. Soon enough, Sonu becomes a police informant for ACP Pratap, who has been looking for Mangal. Becoming a police informant, Sonu manages to convince Mangal that he is a corrupt and shrewd person who will be of use to his gang. Mangal embraces Sonu as his next in command. Sonu, caught between the devil and the deep sea, starts playing a double game. He neither gives information to the ACP nor tells Mangal the truth about him being a police informer. Secretly he plans to run away with Jhanvi so that he can live a peaceful life with her. However, things get risky once a mysterious informer in the police force tells Mangal about Sonu's truth.

During a shootout, Mangal finds out the truth about Sonu and takes his whole gang after him. Sonu, on the run, rings ACP Pratap for help. Pratap then brings his whole police force to the scene. There, Sonu is surrounded by Mangal's gang, which is then gunned down by the police chief commissioner. With only Sonu, Mangal and the chief left, it turns out that the chief is actually Mangal's informer, and they both follow Sonu to a deserted area. There, Sonu meets Pratap and tells him he is done and leaves to go to his wife. However, he is shot by the chief. Pratap, seeing Sonu get killed, shoots the chief commissioner and Mangal multiple times, leading to their deaths.

In the hospital, during Sonu's last words, he tells Pratap that his wife Jhanvi should not know about his death, and Pratap should tell her that he was a criminal who committed smuggling and ran away. After his death, Pratap goes to his house and informs Jhanvi that Sonu ran away from the city. Jhanvi, heartbroken, thinks straight and forgets Sonu, and moves away to carry on life as normal.

Cast 
 Emraan Hashmi as Sonu Dilli "KKC" (Kutti Kameeni Cheez) / Sunil Dhariwal
 Esha Gupta as Dr. Jhanvi Singh Tomar
 Randeep Hooda as Assistant Commissioner Of Police Officer Pratap Raghuvanshi  
 Manish Chaudhary as Mangal Singh Tomar
 Sumeet Nijhawan as Sarfaraz
 Mohammed Zeeshan Ayyub as Balli
 Brijendra Kala as Dadda (ACP's Assistant)
 Arif Zakaria as Police Chief
 Rohit Pathak as Inspector Rajender

Production
Jannat 2 began filming in October 2011, at the lines of Airport Express (Orange Line) of Delhi Metro. The shooting finally completed on 17 January 2012. The title of the film was earlier known as Informer and then Blood Money, however these titles didn't receive positive feedback, therefore director Kunal Deshmukh decided to make the film a sequel to Jannat. Many actresses such as Prachi Desai, Esha Gupta, Kangana Ranaut, Jacqueline Fernandez, Paoli Dam and others were reported to be assigned as the female lead of the film, however, Gupta was chosen amongst the others.

Controversy
Mumbai based writer Kapil Chopra has filed a case against Bhatt's for stealing his script for Jannat 2. The Bombay High Court has asked the Bhatts to deposit Rs 1 million for the alleged plagiarism.

Soundtrack

The music of Jannat 2 is composed by Pritam, with lyrics penned by Sayeed Qadri, Sanjay Masoomm while the title song of the film was written by Mayur Puri.

Track list

Critical reception
The soundtrack of Jannat 2 received positive reviews.

Jitendra Tiwari of Bollywood Hungama gave the album 4/5 stars, saying that "Jannat 2 is a terrific album which has practically each and every song working for it. A genre album which has love forming an integral part of the affairs, it ensures that each of the songs complement each other in a seamless manner." Satyajit of Glamsham gave the album 4/5 stars, stating that "Jannat 2 delivers entertainment, entertainment and entertainment for all rock and sufi music lovers, and should probably add one more musical success in the connoisseur's kitty. Worth-a-buy!!!" The Times of India gave the album 4/5 stars, concluding that "The music of Jannat 2 lives up to your expectations and is an absolute delight for music lovers. Thumbs-up to Jannat 2 music." Atta Khan of Planet Bollywood gave the album 7.5/10 stars, saying that "Jannat 2 is undoubtedly a good soundtrack but it doesn't come with a special aura that the original carried – this is precisely why it was such a big ask to follow up." Mitesh Saraf of Planet Bollywood gave the album 7.5/10 stars, stating that "Jannat 2 is a typical Pritam and Bhatt soundtrack which will definitely rule the charts for the next one month, especially "Tujhe Sochta Hu", "Rab Ka Shukrana" and "Tu Hi Mera"." Music Aloud gave the album 6.5/10 stars, concluding that "Barring a couple of songs, Jannat 2 is same old Bhatt. And I have to grudgingly accept, it still works for most part, despite the repeat."

Release
Jannat 2 released on 4 May 2012, in 1975 screens at 1575 theatres across India.

Critical reception
Jannat 2 received mixed response from critics.

Taran Adarsh of Bollywood Hungama gave the film 4/5 stars, saying that "On the whole, Jannat 2 is an engaging film with tremendous appeal for the masses. An absorbing story, a swift and coherent narrative, exemplary direction, fantastic action, soothing music and stellar performances summarize the highlights of this triumphant franchise." Gaurav Malani of Economic Times gave the film 4/5 stars, stating that "Overlook a few of its sinful indulgences and Jannat 2 can turn out to be a hell of a ride!" Indicine gave the film 3/5 stars, concluding that "Jannat 2 is a typical Bhatt film – it has a bit of everything; great music, romance, good performances, light-hearted moments and love-making scenes." Mrigank Dhaniwala of Koimoi gave the film 3/5 stars, saying that "On the whole, Jannat 2 is an entertaining fare from Vishesh Films. If you go in expecting that, you won't be disappointed." Madhureeta Mukherjee of The Times of India gave the film 3/5 stars, stating that "Jannat 2 is a decent crime caper, but doesn't shoot you between the eyes."

Rajeev Masand of IBNLive gave the film 2.5/5 stars, concluding that "I'm going with two-and-a-half out of five for director Kunal Deshmukh's Jannat 2. It could've been better, but it's not a terrible way to spend an evening out." Kanika Sikka of DNA gave the film 2/5 stars, saying that "The sequel of the 2008 film Jannat, the film is a predictable, yet partly gripping tale of a small-time brat who faces the results of his own deeds. Jannat 2 is worth a one-time watch, since there aren't many options for the movie-goers this weekend." Zee News gave the film 2/5 stars, stating that "Watch Jannat 2 for its catchy numbers (better still, buy a CD!). And since there aren't many options this weekend, you can count that as a reason to go watch the movie!" Martin D'Souza of Glamsham gave the film 2/5 stars, concluding that "Kunal Deshmukh's Jannat 2 can be best described as patchy. The storyline lacks imagination and given this backdrop, he tries his best to weave a plot into the scenes. By the way, this film could have been called by any other name. It's not a sequel!" Mansha

Dainik Bhaskar gave the film 1.5/5 stars, stating that "For all those Emraan's fans, who can endure anything to see him on-screen- this one's for you. But still we would say, beware. This Jannat is far away from fairytales!" Meetu of Wogma gave the film 1.5/5 stars, concluding that "Overall, Jannat 2 is another one of those standard crime romances to come out of the Bhatt stable – only less engaging than the average Vishesh Films' product." Sonia Chopra of Sify gave the film 1.5/5 stars, saying that "A tired story with cliched characters propped-up by an OD on machismo, some dialogue-baazi, and a gorgeous heroine does not a film make. At least not one worth watching." Kunal Guha of Yahoo! gave the film 1/5 stars, stating that "If there is a Jannat anywhere, it is outside the screen playing this film." Raja Sen of Rediff gave the film 1/5 stars, concluding that "A lot would have been forgiven – as it often is with these producers – if the film had either a meatier plot or a more gripping narrative, but this one's just tiresome as the obvious story drags on. A couple of chase sequences, particularly one through the arteries of a Dargah, are slickly shot, but even these lose their charm as they get needlessly long-winded."

Box office

India
Jannat 2 opened strongly at the box office, collecting  nett on its first day. The movie collected  in its first weekend. The movie collected  in its first week. The movie was declared as a "Hit", collecting 700 million (US$6.7 million) in its entire theatrical run.

Overseas
Jannat 2 was poor at the overseas, collecting $500,000 in its first weekend.

Awards and nominations

References

External links
 

2012 films
2010s Hindi-language films
2012 crime thriller films
Indian crime thriller films
Films shot in Delhi
Films featuring songs by Pritam
Fox Star Studios films
Indian sequel films